The 1927 Nevada Wolf Pack football team was an American football team that represented the University of Nevada in the Far Western Conference (FWC) during the 1927 college football season. In their third season under head coach Buck Shaw, the team compiled a 2–6–1 record (1–3 FWC) and finished fifth in the conference.

Schedule

References

Nevada
Nevada Wolf Pack football seasons
Nevada Wolf Pack football